Bodhan Assembly constituency is a constituency of Telangana Legislative Assembly, India. It is one of five constituencies in Nizamabad district. It is part of Nizamabad Lok Sabha constituency.

Currently the constituency is held by Telangana Rashtra Samithi leader Shakil.

Mandals
The Assembly Constituency presently comprises the following Mandals:

Members of Legislative Assembly

Election results

Telangana Legislative Assembly election, 2018

Telangana Legislative Assembly election, 2014

Andhra Pradesh Legislative Assembly election, 2009

See also
 List of constituencies of Telangana Legislative Assembly

References

Assembly constituencies of Telangana
Nizamabad district